Brainsmasher... A Love Story is a 1993 American romantic comedy film written and directed by Albert Pyun. It stars Andrew "Dice" Clay as Ed "The Brainsmasher" Malloy and Teri Hatcher as Samantha Crain.

Plot
Ed Malloy, a tough bouncer from Portland, Oregon, is dragged into a twisted web of lies, magic and kung fu.  Samantha Crain is a glamorous supermodel who has everything—except for true love.  Her sister Cammy is an "Indiana Jones" styled botanist in search of a very rare lotus flower.

Meanwhile, a group of Chinese Shaolin monks with high-flying martial arts powers are in search of the lotus as well, because they believe that whoever eats its petals will gain infinite powers. (They also indignantly protest, "We are NOT ninjas!" when anyone mischaracterizes them.)

Samantha receives a package from her sister, who is trying to escape back to America, with the Shaolin monks hot on her tail. The package is the rare lotus flower. It's arranged for the Crain sisters to meet in Portland.  But the monks intervene, and the Crain sisters flee separately. While racing through the streets of Portland, Samantha seeks refuge in a bar that employs Ed Malloy (Andrew "Dice" Clay), who is notoriously nicknamed "The Brainsmasher."

Malloy sees the monks and decides to help Samantha. While on the chase from the monks (and occasionally, Malloy's mother), the two fall in love.

Desperate, the monks capture Malloy and hold him for ransom: His life for the lotus. The Crain sisters agree, but then double-cross the monks, and Malloy saves the day by living up to his 'Brainsmasher' moniker.

Cast

Release

The movie was released directly to videocassette in 1993 by Vidmark Entertainment. The movie has never been released in the United States on DVD and as of January 4, 2010, Lionsgate has yet to announce any plans for a DVD release.  It is available on DVD in Australia and the United Kingdom.

References

External links 
 

1993 direct-to-video films
American romantic comedy films
Films directed by Albert Pyun
1993 romantic comedy films
Films set in Portland, Oregon
Films shot in Portland, Oregon
1993 films
1990s English-language films
1990s American films